Sangaldan is a town and block, near Ramban town in the Ramban district of the Indian union territory of Jammu and Kashmir. It falls in the Gool-Gulabgarh area of the Chenab valley.

Transport 
A public bus service is available. The nearest railway station and national highway are more than 10 km away. A state highway and district road pass through. Pucca road, Kuccha Road and foot paths are within the village.

Sangaldan railway station
Sangaldan railway station is a proposed railway station in the Ramban district, Jammu and Kashmir. Its code is SNGDN and will serve Sangaldan city. The station proposal includes two platforms. The station lies on the Banihal - Katra rail line.

Sangaldan Railway Tunnel
The Sangaldan Railway Tunnel is a  railway tunnel between Katra-Banihal section of Jammu–Baramulla line located to the north of Sangaldan town of middle Himalayas in Jammu and Kashmir, India near Ramban. The tunnel was completed on 4 December 2010.

Sangaldan firing incident
The Sangaldan firing incident refers to the shooting on a crowd of Kashmiri protesters by the BSF on 18 July 2013 in the Dharam area of Sangaldan. Four people were killed (including Manzoor Ahmed Shan, Javed Manhas) and 44 were injured, according to official sources, although residents claimed that six had been killed.

Government 
Dr. Shamshada Shan was elected Chairperson of District Development Council Ramban in 2021. She was previously elected as the District Development Council Member from the Sangaldan constituency in 2020.

Rabiya Beigh was elected as her deputy.

Navida Begum was elected Block Development Council Chairperson in 2019.

Geography

Tata Pani (Hot Spring)
Tata Pani is a hot water spring located at Sangaldan in Ramban district and is deemed by Kashmir-based people best cure skin and bone diseases. People from various areas of Kashmir especially from Kulgam and Anantnag districts, came for having a bath in the spring for curing the diseases in July and August months.

This place is famous for the sulphur spring whose water is believed to have miraculous healing powers. Thousands of people throng the place from June to ending November every year from within and outside the state particularly from neighbouring Punjab state to take a dip in these revered springs to get rid themselves of ailments, particularly Dermatitis and Arthritis.

Demographics 

In the 2011 census it had a population of 876 people in 476 households. The female population is 47.4%. The village literacy rate is 54.9% and the female literacy rate is 21.9%.

Geography 
Forest covers 134.4 hectares, the non-agricultural area is 10.5 hectares, and total irrigated area is 24.3 hectares.

Education
Private and government private, middle and secondary schools are available. The nearest government arts and science degree college and government ITI colleges are in Ramban. The nearest government disabled school, government engineering college, government medical college, government MBA college and government polytechnic college are in Jammu.

Colleges
Government degree college Gool

Schools
 GHSS Sangaldan
 Diamond Public School, Sangaldan
 G.M.A Sangaldan
 GMS Sangaldan
 GHSS Dalwah
 Prince Valley Public School Kantha
 Blooming Flowers Dalwah

Infrastructure

Health
One primary health care centre, one veterinary hospital, and four medical shops are available, including Naik Medical hall Chandail Morh Dalwah operate there.

Drinking water and sanitation 
Nonpotable water is available all year round. A hand pump is the drinking water source. No drainage system is available. No system to collects garbage. Drain water is discharged directly into water bodies.

Communication and media
A sub post office is available. Mobile coverage is available.

Electricity
This village has a power supply with a 14-hour power window in summer, and about 8-hours in winter. Ten hours of agricultural power supply in summer and twelve hours in winter are available.

Other 
Anganwadi centre and polling station are there.

Economy
J&K Bank and an ATM are available.

Maize, potatoes and beans are agricultural commodities. Total irrigated area in this village is 24.3 hectares from canals. Carpets are handicrafts made there.

See also 
 Sangaldan Tunnel
 Sangaldan Railway Station
 Banihal

References

External links 
 Gool Firing: CPIM demands arrest of  BSF personnel
Census Data 2011 J&K, Ramban
Census
 Tourist Spots in Ramban (Tatta Pani)
 J&K Bank Sangaldan

Villages in Ramban district